Yordan Eftimov (born January 23, 1971, in Razgrad) is a poet, writer and literary critic based in Sofia, Bulgaria. He has six poetry books awarded with national literary prizes. First of them, Metametaphysics (1993), won the National Debut Prize.

He finished the National Highschool for Classical Languages and Cultures in Sofia and later graduated in Bulgarian philology from the Sofia St. Kliment Ohridki University.

He is the author of many literary criticism articles in Bulgarian periodicals, among which the annual reviews of the Bulgarian Literature in the Demokrarticheski pregled (Democratic Review) magazine.

He is an assistant professor in theory of literature at the New Bulgarian University, Sofia. Among the subjects he teaches are BULB715 – The Bulgarian Modernism, and BULB602 – The Literature of the Balkans after the Balkan Wars and until Nowadays.

Since 1993, with some intervals, he has been the editor of the independent weekly issue for culture Literaturen Vestnik (Literary Newspaper). He is also the editor of the magazines Ezik i Literatura (Language and Literature) and Sledva (Next).

He is the author of the popular science book Modernism (2003). He is an active critic-observer of the paper market of Kapital newspaper (since November 2008), author and presenter of the Paper Tigers Programme on Radio France International (2001- 2005), of Studio Helikon in the programme Horizont (Horizon) on the Bulgarian National Radio (2005–2007) and of Zona za Chetene (Reading Zone) on Pro BG TV (since November 2009).

National awards
 National Award Hristo G. Danov for Literary Criticism, 2006, winner;
 Ivan Nikolov National Award for Poetry, 2013, winner;
 Hristo Fotev National Award for Poetry, 2014, winner.

Bibliography

Poetry 

Metametaphysics. София: Свободно поетическо общество, 1993, 52 с.
Bulgarian reader. (в съавторство с Георги Господинов, Бойко Пенчев и Пламен Дойнов). София: Свободно поетическо общество, 1995
Eleven Indian Tales. София: Изд. ателие „Аб“, 1997, 36 с.
Africa / Numbers. Пловдив: изд. Жанет-45, 1998, 56 + 40 с.
Bulgarian Anthology. (в съавторство с Георги Господинов, Бойко Пенчев и Пламен Дойнов). София: Свободно поетическо общество, 1998.
Opera nigra. София: Анубис, 2001.
My wife always says. Пловдив: изд. Жанет-45, 2005, 96 с.
The heart is not a creator. София: Смол стейшънс прес, 2013, 60 с.
Proven theories, final experiments. София: Смол стейшънс прес, 2018

Monographs 

The ill-fated virtue. Essays on Tsvetan Marangozov. Изд. ателие „Аб“, С., 2008, 134 с.
The Double Bottom of the Classics: From Botev and Vazov to Yovkov and Dalchev. Изд. „Хермес“, Пловдив, 2010, 183 с.
Here lies the rabbit. ИК „Сиела“, С., 2010, 204 с.
Divine Mathematics: Bulgarian Symbolist Poetry. София: Просвета, 2012, 336 с.
Poetics of Agreement and Disagreement: Bulgarian Literature of 1950s – 1990s and Ideology. София: Нов български университет, 2013, 318 с.
Literature around zero. Fulfilled and unfulfilled projective analyzes and engaged forecasts. София: Просвета, 2019, 288 с.
 Strategies without Tactics: Quarantinscapes and other micro-essays from Linkedin and from the mind's warehouse. София: Смол стейшънс прес, 2021, 170 с. (ISBN 9789543841226)

References

External links
 New Bulgarian University Faculty profile
 Eftimov at his Bulgarian publisher's web page
 
 

1971 births
Living people
21st-century Bulgarian writers
20th-century Bulgarian poets
Bulgarian male poets
Bulgarian literary critics
Sofia University alumni
Academic staff of New Bulgarian University
People from Razgrad
20th-century male writers